Tchórzowa  is a village in the administrative district of Gmina Miedzna, within Węgrów County, Masovian Voivodeship, in east-central Poland.

References

 :pl:Tch%C3%B3rzowa

Villages in Węgrów County